Vrela (Serbian Cyrillic: Врела) is a rather small village in Teslić municipality, in Republic of Srpska, Bosnia and Herzegovina.

Today it is an individual local community within the municipality. Previously it was but an insignificant part of neighbouring local communities such as Žarkovina and Stenjak within Teslić municipality, or Kalošević within Tešanj municipality. The population numbers less than 200, all of Serb ethnicity, 97% of Orthodox Christian religion.

It is bordered by the river Usora to the north and hills to the south, the Škrebin Kamen hill (literally: Škreba's Rock) to the west and the Kalošević village to the east. It is the first settlement of the Teslić municipality encountered when approaching from Doboj.

Until 1968 there was a railway station in Vrela.

During the war in Bosnia, the village was an important border crossing between the then warring Republic of Srpska and Federation of Bosnia and Herzegovina, where numerous exchanges of POWs, civilians and casualties were conducted. The area around the Inter-Entity Boundary Line was heavily seeded with mine-fields and some parts are still considered dangerous. 

Villages in Bosnia and Herzegovina
Villages in Republika Srpska
Teslić